Stanislav Levý (born 2 May 1958) is a Czech football manager and former player, whose playing position was defender.

During his club career, Levý played for Bohemians 1905, SpVgg Blau-Weiß 1890 Berlin and Tennis Borussia Berlin. He also made 25 appearances for the Czechoslovakia national team.

Honours

Player 
 TJ Bohemians Praha
 Czechoslovak First League 1982-83

Manager 
 KF Skënderbeu Korçë
 Albanian Superliga: 2011–12

References

External links 
 
 

1958 births
Living people
Footballers from Prague
Association football defenders
Czech footballers
Czechoslovak footballers
Czechoslovakia international footballers
2. Bundesliga players
Bohemians 1905 players
FK Hvězda Cheb players
Tennis Borussia Berlin players
Czechoslovak expatriate footballers
Czech expatriate footballers
Czechoslovak expatriate sportspeople in West Germany
Czech expatriate sportspeople in Germany
Czech football managers
Czech First League managers
Kategoria Superiore managers
Tennis Borussia Berlin managers
Hannover 96 managers
FK Viktoria Žižkov managers
FC Viktoria Plzeň managers
FC Fastav Zlín managers
KF Skënderbeu Korçë managers
Śląsk Wrocław managers
Flamurtari Vlorë managers
1. FC Slovácko managers
Czech expatriate football managers
Expatriate football managers in Germany
Czech expatriate sportspeople in Albania
Expatriate football managers in Albania
Czech expatriate sportspeople in Poland
Expatriate football managers in Poland
Expatriate footballers in West Germany